The Albert Cotter Bridge, also known as the Tibby Cotter bridge, is a pedestrian bridge across Anzac Parade, Sydney, New South Wales, Australia. It was built to primarily to cater for crowds exiting the Sydney Cricket Ground and Sydney Football Stadium.

History
Construction on the Albert Cotter Bridge commenced in 2014. It was opened in time for the 2015 Cricket World Cup. It was named after Albert "Tibby" Cotter, an Australian Test cricket player killed in World War I. It is a shared pedestrian and cycle pathway. The  bridge features concrete helical approach ramps and a superstructure formed using two curved steel box beams.

The bridge's construction was criticised by the Auditor-General of New South Wales finding that the tight construction timeline significantly added 25 million to its cost. Additional criticism was raised by the Heritage Council of New South Wales due to the relocation of a monument on Anzac Parade and cycling lobby groups as the walkway does not connect with existing cycleways.

Criticism 
Since its opening, the design of the Albert Cotter bridge has been heavily criticised by pedestrians. It has been described as a "white elephant" for its inappropriate positioning and, because the helical approach forces pedestrians to walk 440 metres to travel ~200 metres, it has also been called "the worst", and "a dumb bridge because it goes around in a big circle".

References

Bridges completed in 2015
Bridges in Sydney
Concrete bridges in Australia
Cyclist bridges in Australia
Pedestrian bridges in Australia
2015 establishments in Australia